Maria Fernanda Pontífice de Jesus Bonfim (born 1955) is a São Toméan academic and politician. She was one of the first group of female members of the National Assembly in 1975 and later served as Minister of Education and Culture.

Biography
Born in 1955, Pontífice graduated from the University of Lisbon with a degree in literature. In December 1975 she was appointed to the National Assembly as one of the first group of six women in the legislature. After working as an advisor to the Ministry of Education and Culture, in 2002 she was appointed Minister of Education and Culture. She was re-elected to parliament in the 2006 elections, but in the same year was appointed dean of the Universidade Lusíada de São Tomé e Príncipe and resigned from parliament to focus on this role. In 2008 she was elected president of the women's section of the Democratic Convergence Party. She later became rector of the Universidade Lusíada

References

1955 births
University of Lisbon alumni
Women government ministers of São Tomé and Príncipe
Members of the National Assembly (São Tomé and Príncipe)
Movement for the Liberation of São Tomé and Príncipe/Social Democratic Party politicians
Government ministers of São Tomé and Príncipe
Democratic Convergence Party (São Tomé and Príncipe) politicians
Living people
20th-century São Tomé and Príncipe politicians
21st-century São Tomé and Príncipe politicians
20th-century women politicians
21st-century women politicians
Women deans (academic)